Roberto Sánchez Piñas (born 1 October 1989 in Alcalá de Henares, Madrid) is a Spanish footballer who plays for CD San Fernando de Henares as a midfielder.

His debut was on 2 January 2011, against Córdoba, playing the last 24 minutes of the game, after came off the bench  to replace Verza.

References

External links

1989 births
Living people
Spanish footballers
Footballers from the Community of Madrid
Association football midfielders
Segunda División players
Segunda División B players
Tercera División players
Rayo Vallecano B players
Atlético Albacete players
Albacete Balompié players